Ano Achaia ( meaning Upper Achaea) is a village in the municipality of West Achaea, Greece. It is located 4 km south of Kato Achaia and 2 km west of Lousika. In 2011 Ano Achaia had a population of 229.

Population

External links
 Agiovlasitika GTP Travel Pages

See also

List of settlements in Achaea

References

Dymi, Achaea
Populated places in Achaea